The 2017 Aegon International Eastbourne was a combined men's and women's tennis tournament played on outdoor grass courts. It was the 43rd edition of the event for women and the seventh edition for men. The tournament was classified as a WTA Premier tournament on the WTA Tour and as an ATP World Tour 250 series on the ATP Tour. The event took place at the Devonshire Park Lawn Tennis Club in Eastbourne, United Kingdom from 26 June to 1 July 2017.

Points and prize money

Point distribution

Prize money

ATP singles main-draw entrants

Seeds

 1 Rankings are as of 19 June 2017.

Other entrants
The following players received wildcards into the main draw:
 Novak Djokovic
 Gaël Monfils
 Cameron Norrie

The following players received entry from the qualifying draw:
 Thomas Fabbiano 
 Norbert Gombos 
 Vasek Pospisil 
 Franko Škugor

Withdrawals
Before the tournament
 Aljaž Bedene →replaced by  Frances Tiafoe
 Pablo Cuevas →replaced by  Horacio Zeballos
 Dan Evans →replaced by  Jiří Veselý
 Feliciano López →replaced by  Dušan Lajović
 Florian Mayer →replaced by  Jared Donaldson
 Gilles Müller →replaced by  Kevin Anderson

ATP doubles main-draw entrants

Seeds

1 Rankings are as of 19 June 2017.

Other entrants
The following pairs received wildcards into the doubles main draw:
  Scott Clayton /  Jonny O'Mara
  Brydan Klein /  Joe Salisbury

The following pair received entry as alternates:
  Thomas Fabbiano /  Luke Saville

Withdrawals
Before the tournament
  Ivan Dodig

WTA singles main-draw entrants

Seeds

 1 Rankings are as of 19 June 2017.

Other entrants
The following players received wildcards into the main draw:
 Naomi Broady
 Simona Halep
 Angelique Kerber 
 Petra Kvitová
 Heather Watson

The following players received entry from the qualifying draw:
 Lara Arruabarrena
 Mona Barthel 
 Duan Yingying
 Hsieh Su-wei 
 Varvara Lepchenko 
 Francesca Schiavone

The following players received entry as lucky losers:
 Verónica Cepede Royg
 Sorana Cîrstea
 Lauren Davis
 Kristína Kučová
 Risa Ozaki
 Tsvetana Pironkova

Withdrawals 
Before the tournament
  Catherine Bellis →replaced by  Lauren Davis 
  Kiki Bertens →replaced by  Christina McHale 
  Julia Görges →replaced by  Kristína Kučová
  Daria Kasatkina →replaced by  Verónica Cepede Royg
  Petra Kvitová →replaced by  Tsvetana Pironkova
  Monica Puig →replaced by  Elise Mertens
  Lucie Šafářová →replaced by  Risa Ozaki
  Samantha Stosur → replaced by  Eugenie Bouchard
  CoCo Vandeweghe →replaced by  Sorana Cîrstea

During the tournament
  Johanna Konta (spine injury)

Retirements 
  Ana Konjuh
  Christina McHale
  Yulia Putintseva

WTA doubles main-draw entrants

Seeds

1 Rankings are as of 19 June 2017.

Other entrants
The following pair received a wildcard into the doubles main draw:
  Nicole Melichar /  Anna Smith

Withdrawals
Before the tournament
  Kirsten Flipkens

During the tournament
  Ekaterina Makarova

Champions

Men's singles

  Novak Djokovic def.  Gaël Monfils, 6–3, 6–4

Women's singles

  Karolína Plíšková def.  Caroline Wozniacki, 6–4, 6–4

Men's doubles

  Bob Bryan /  Mike Bryan def.  Rohan Bopanna /  André Sá,  6–7(4–7), 6–4, [10–3]

Women's doubles

  Chan Yung-jan /  Martina Hingis def.  Ashleigh Barty /  Casey Dellacqua, 6–3, 7–5

References

External links
 Website

2017 in English tennis
2017 WTA Tour
2017
June 2017 sports events in the United Kingdom